Charles Anthony Roxborough III (November 25, 1888October 8, 1963) was the first African-American man elected to the Michigan Senate.

Early life
Roxborough was born in Plaquemine, Louisiana on November 25, 1888 to parents Charles Anthony Roxborough (1856-1908) and Virginia Gertrude Roxborough (1863-1935). The senior Charles, a native of Cleveland, Ohio who was of European and African descent and was born free, became prominent in law and politics in New Orleans, where he met and married Valerie, also of Creole European and African descent, in 1886. The younger Charles was one of four children born to the couple, including Thomas Simms (1889-1920), John Walter (1892-1975), and Claude (1893-1955).

In 1899, for the sake of his children, the elder Charles moved his family out of the South to Detroit, where the family became even more prominent, spawning five generations of lawyers. Charles and other members of the family were described as "mulatto," the slave-era term for biracial. The family were notably light-skinned owing to their white ancestry.

Education
Roxborough graduated from Detroit public schools. Roxborough went on to graduate from Detroit College of Law.

Career
Roxborough practiced law in Detroit. In 1922, Roxborough unsuccessfully ran for the Michigan Senate seat representing the 3rd district. On November 4, 1930, Roxborough was elected to the Michigan Senate where he represented the 3rd district from January 7, 1931 to 1932. Roxborough was not re-elected in 1932. In 1932, Roxborough was a delegate to Michigan convention to ratify 21st amendment from the Wayne County 1st District. Roxborough unsuccessfully ran for the United States House of Representatives seat representing Michigan's 1st district in 1934, 1936, and 1938. Roxborough was a delegate to the Republican National Convention from Michigan in 1936, 1940, and 1944.

Personal life
Roxborough married three times, to Cassandra Pease of Hamilton, Ontario in 1913, Charlotte "Lottie" Grady in 1919, and Hazel A. Lyman, an official at Detroit Recorder’s Court, in 1944. Elsie and Virginia were born to Charles and Cassandra, but Cassandra died shortly after Virginia's birth. Another two children, Charles IV (aka "Sonny") and John Walter, were born to Charles and Lottie.

Roxborough's brother John was a boxing manager whose most famous client was Joe Louis.

Death
Roxborough died in Michigan on October 8, 1963. Roxborough was interred at Woodmere Cemetery.

References

1888 births
1963 deaths
African-American lawyers
People from Plaquemine, Louisiana
Lawyers from Detroit
Politicians from Detroit
Detroit College of Law alumni
African-American state legislators in Michigan
Republican Party Michigan state senators
African-American men in politics
20th-century American lawyers
20th-century African-American politicians
20th-century American politicians
Roxborough family